The SpongeBob SquarePants film series consists of American-made animated/live-action children's-comedies, based on and a continuation of the animated television series of the same name. The films are distributed by Paramount Pictures. The films feature the regular television voice cast: Tom Kenny, Bill Fagerbakke, Rodger Bumpass, Clancy Brown, Mr. Lawrence, Jill Talley, Carolyn Lawrence, Mary Jo Catlett and Lori Alan.

Plans for a film based on the series began in 2001 when Nickelodeon and Paramount Pictures began approaching series creator Stephen Hillenburg for a theatrical feature. He initially refused their offers, but began developing it in 2002 upon completion of the show's third season. Hillenburg directed the film, titled The SpongeBob SquarePants Movie, which was theatrically released in the United States on November 19, 2004, to critical and commercial success. It was originally planned to act as the series finale, but the series success led to the production of more episodes. Sponge Out of Water, directed by former showrunner Paul Tibbitt, followed in 2015. A third film, Sponge on the Run, was directed by former show writer Tim Hill and released in 2020.

As of February 2022, four additional films were announced to be in development, including a fourth theatrical SpongeBob SquarePants film set to be released in May 2025, and three spinoff films being developed for streaming release exclusively on Paramount+.

Films

The SpongeBob SquarePants Movie (2004)

In this live-action animated comedy, Plankton's plan is to steal King Neptune's crown and send it to the dangerous Shell City, and then frame Mr. Krabs for the crime. SpongeBob and Patrick must journey to Shell City while facing several perils along the way to retrieve the crown to save Mr. Krabs from Neptune's wrath and Bikini Bottom from Plankton's tyranny.

The SpongeBob Movie: Sponge Out of Water (2015)

The plot follows a pirate named Burger Beard (Antonio Banderas), who steals the Krabby Patty secret formula using a magical book that makes any text written upon it come true. After Bikini Bottom turns into an apocalyptic cesspool and the citizens turn against SpongeBob, he must team up with Plankton to find the formula and save Bikini Bottom. Later, SpongeBob, Patrick, Squidward, Mr. Krabs, Sandy and Plankton must travel to the surface to confront Burger Beard and get the formula back before Bikini Bottom is completely destroyed.

The SpongeBob Movie: Sponge on the Run (2020)

A third film was released in Canadian theatres on August 14, 2020 followed by a limited video on demand release and Paramount+ release on March 4, 2021. The film was directed by Tim Hill, who also wrote the screenplay with Michael Kvamme from a story by Aaron Springer, Jonathan Aibel and Glenn Berger. The show's principal voice actors—Tom Kenny, Bill Fagerbakke, Rodger Bumpass, Clancy Brown, Mr. Lawrence, Jill Talley, Carolyn Lawrence, Mary Jo Catlett and Lori Alan— reprised their roles. The film depicts how SpongeBob met his friends for the first time at a summer camp while saving Gary. The film uses full CGI animation provided by Mikros Image for underwater sequences. On January 23, 2019, it was confirmed that production on the film had officially begun.

Future

Untitled fourth SpongeBob film (2025)
In August 2021, Nickelodeon CEO Brian Robbins, mentioned that "there's a new SpongeBob [film] in the works". A fourth film was officially confirmed in February 2022, with a targeted theatrical release of the film. On November 10, 2022, it was announced that the film will release in theaters on May 23, 2025.

Spinoff films
In February 2022, it was announced that three character spinoff films were in development with intended streaming releases exclusively on Paramount+. The first untitled film is scheduled to release in 2023.

Saving Bikini Bottom (2023)
In May 2021, a spin-off Sandy Cheeks feature film was announced to be in development from Nickelodeon for streaming television, to be directed by Liza Johnson from a script written by Kaz and Tom J. Stern and described as a hybrid feature that will put the animated title character into a live-action setting. On August 12, 2021, the title of the movie was revealed as Saving Bikini Bottom.

In August 2021, it was revealed that plans to film Saving Bikini Bottom in Los Alamos were scrapped due to rewrites of the script. On February 17, 2023, it was revealed that it would be released on Netflix in 2023.

Cast and characters

 A dark grey cell indicates that the character does not appear in the film.

Production

The SpongeBob SquarePants Movie
Nickelodeon and Paramount Pictures had approached SpongeBob SquarePants creator Stephen Hillenburg for a film based on the show as early as 2001, but he refused for more than a year. He was concerned, after watching The Iron Giant and Toy Story with his son, about the challenge of SpongeBob and Patrick doing something more cinematically consequential and inspiring without losing what he called the SpongeBob "cadence." He said, on a break from season four post-production, "To do a 75-minute movie about SpongeBob wanting to make some jellyfish jelly would be a mistake, I think [...] This had to be SpongeBob in a great adventure. That's where the comedy's coming from, having these two naïve characters, SpongeBob and Patrick, a doofus and an idiot, on this incredibly dangerous heroic odyssey with all the odds against them." The writers decided to write a mythical hero's quest for the 2004 film: the search for a stolen crown, which brings SpongeBob and Patrick to the surface. Of the plot, Bill Fagerbakke (the voice of Patrick) said, "It's just nuts. I'm continually dazzled and delighted with what these guys came up with."

Production on the first film began in 2002 after Hillenburg and the show's staff completed the third season. A tongue-in-cheek announcement of the film's plot from early on stated that it would feature SpongeBob rescuing Patrick from a fisherman in Florida. This was intended as a humorous reference to Finding Nemo and was later confirmed by Tom Kenny (the voice of SpongeBob) to be a "joke" plot to keep fans busy. Hillenburg wrote the film with five other writer-animators from the show (Paul Tibbitt, Derek Drymon, Aaron Springer, Kent Osborne and Tim Hill) over a three-month period in a room of a former Glendale, California bankit, and also directed and produced the film. Osborne said, "It was hugely fun [...] although it did get kind of gamy in there.".

The first film was intended to be the series finale; Hillenburg wanted to end the franchise after the movie was completed so it "wouldn't jump the shark". However, Nickelodeon desired more episodes due to the franchise's growing popularity. Hillenburg stated: "Well, there was concern when we did the movie [in 2004] that the show had peaked. There were concerns among executives at Nickelodeon." As a result, Hillenburg resigned as the series' showrunner, appointing writer, director, and storyboard artist Paul Tibbitt to succeed him. Hillenburg still remained involved with the series, reviewing each episode and submitting suggestions.

The SpongeBob Movie: Sponge Out of Water
In 2010, The New York Times reported that Nickelodeon had approached the show's crew to make a second film. The network hoped to give itself and the global franchise "a boost" by releasing another film. The Los Angeles Times reported that Paramount had "another SpongeBob picture" in development in March 2011. Philippe Dauman, then president and CEO of Paramount and Viacom, announced on February 28, 2012, that a sequel film was in development and slated for a late 2014 release. Dauman added that the film "will serve to start off or be one of our films that starts off our new animation effort." Nickelodeon expected the film to do much better in foreign box office than the 2004 feature, given its increasingly global reach. Dauman said, "This will continue to propel SpongeBob internationally."
Production on the second movie was announced on June 10, 2014. Stephen Hillenburg returned to act as the film's executive producer, and contributed to the story of the film.

The SpongeBob Movie: Sponge on the Run
In a February 2015 interview discussing The SpongeBob Movie: Sponge Out of Water success at the box office, Megan Colligan, president of worldwide distribution and marketing at Paramount Pictures, stated the possibility of a third film was "a good bet." In another interview, Paramount vice-chairman Rob Moore remarked, "Hopefully, it won't take 10 years to make another film," in reference to the time passed between The SpongeBob SquarePants Movie (2004) and its 2015 sequel. Later in 2015, it was revealed that Paramount was developing sequels to its franchises, including another SpongeBob film.

The film was initially scheduled for release theatrically in 2019, before being delayed to 2020. The film later had its theatrical run cancelled due to the ongoing COVID-19 pandemic and instead released on video on demand and Paramount+. The film had an exclusive theatrical run in Canada on August 14, 2020, and premiered on Netflix three months later in international countries. By January 2016, Jonathan Aibel and Glenn Berger had been hired to write the film. In April 2018, the film's official title was revealed as The SpongeBob Movie: It's a Wonderful Sponge, and SpongeBob co-developer Tim Hill was announced as director and writer for the film. On November 12, 2019, it was revealed that the film's title was changed from It's a Wonderful Sponge to Sponge on the Run.

Reception

Box office performance

Critical and public reception

Additional crew and production details

References

Film series introduced in 2004
 
Animated film series
Paramount Pictures franchises
Comedy film series
Children's film series